The Singer in the Mask is an Israeli reality singing competition television show based on The Masked Singer franchise which originated from the South Korean version of the show King of Mask Singer. It is broadcast on the Israeli network, Channel 12.

The first season premiered on 23 September 2020 and finished on 5 December 2020. At the finale of the first season, the Rooster (actor/singer Tzachi Halevy) was declared the winner while the Dragonfly (singer and children's star Rinat Gabay) was the runner-up.

A second season premiered on 16 October 2021 and finished on 18 December 2021. At the finale of the second season, the Gorilla (actor/singer Shai Gabso) was declared the winner while the Spaghetti (actor Oz Zehavi) was the runner-up.

A third season premiered on 17 December 2022 and finished on 18 February 2023. At the finale of the third season, the Spider (actress Yael Elkana) was declared the winner while the Fish (singer/actress Adi Bity) was the runner-up.

Panelists and host 
The show is hosted by the television presenter Ido Rosenblum, with the judging panel comprising the journalist Ofira Asayag, the comedian Shahar Hason, the musical pop duo Static & Ben El Tavori, and the director Tzedi Tzarfati.

Series overview

Season 1

Season 2

Season 3

References

Notes

External links
 

Israeli television series based on South Korean television series
Music competitions in Israel

Hebrew-language television shows
2020 Israeli television series debuts
Channel 12 (Israel) original programming